The Burkinabé Red Cross Society was founded in 1961. It is headquartered in Ouagadougou, Burkina Faso.

In 2020 the Burkinabé Red Cross Society was targeted by manipulation campaign.

References

External links
Official website
Burkinabé Red Cross Society Profile
Official Red Cross Web Site 

1961 establishments in Upper Volta
Medical and health organisations based in Burkina Faso
Red Cross and Red Crescent national societies
Organizations established in 1961